The 2022 All-Ireland Senior Football Championship was the 135th edition of the Gaelic Athletic Association's premier inter-county Gaelic football tournament since its establishment in 1887.

Tyrone entered the championship as the defending champions, but were defeated by Derry in the Ulster Championship and eliminated by Armagh in the All-Ireland Qualifiers.

Thirty three teams took part: all thirty two Irish counties except Kilkenny were joined by London and New York, both of whom were back in the competition for the first time since 2019, an absence caused by public health restrictions imposed by the COVID-19 pandemic.

This year, the championship split into a two-tier system for the first time, with the Tailteann Cup being the second-tier competition for those teams that did not qualify for the tier 1 Sam Maguire Cup competition. To qualify for the Sam Maguire competition, a county team needed to (a) reach their provincial final or (b) finish in Division 1 or 2 (after promotion and relegation were determined in the 2022 National Football League).  This system was planned to only be used for the 2022 season, with it moving to exactly sixteen teams continuing in the Sam Maguire competition from 2023 onwards.

The draws for the provincial championships took place on 27 November 2021.

The All-Ireland final was played on 24 July 2022 at Croke Park in Dublin, between Galway and Kerry. Kerry won their 38th title after a 0–20 to 0–16 win against Galway.

Competition format

Provincial Championships format
Connacht, Leinster, Munster and Ulster each organise a provincial championship.  All teams who lose a match in their provincial championship progress to either the All-Ireland qualifiers (tier 1) or the Tailteann Cup (tier 2).  All provincial matches are knock-out.

Qualifiers format
All counties in the competition play in their provincial championships. However, only the counties in National Football League Division 1 and Division 2 play in the All-Ireland Championship qualifiers after losing a game in their provincial championships.  The counties in National Football League Division 3 and Division 4 (as they stand when the 2022 league concludes after the resulting promotion and relegation changes have been applied) do not progress into the All-Ireland series and instead enter the second-tier Tailteann Cup once they are knocked out of their provincial championship.   The only exception to this is that all eight provincial finalists progress, regardless of their league division; the four provincial champions progress to the All-Ireland quarter-finals, while the four beaten provincial finalists will play off against the best four teams from the Qualifiers for a place in the quarter-finals.

Division 1 and 2 teams who are knocked out of their province without reaching the provincial final play off in the Qualifiers, on a straight knock-out basis.  The four survivors play off with the four beaten provincial championship finalists, in a final qualifier round to complete the double-elimination format.  The four winners of this final qualifier round join the four provincial champions in the All-Ireland quarter-finals.

All-Ireland format
The four provincial champions play the four winners of the final round of the qualifiers in the quarter-finals. Two semi-finals and a final follow. All matches are knock-out.

Team allocation

Provincial championships

Connacht Senior Football Championship

London and New York were withdrawn from the 2020 and 2021 Connacht championships due to international travel restrictions imposed due to the COVID-19 pandemic, but both are back in the 2022 season.

The winning finalist advanced to the All-Ireland SFC quarter-finals, while the losing finalist advanced to the All-Ireland SFC qualifiers.

Leinster Senior Football Championship

The winning finalist advanced to the All-Ireland SFC quarter-finals, while the losing finalist advanced to the All-Ireland SFC qualifiers.

Munster Senior Football Championship

The winning finalist advanced to the All-Ireland SFC quarter-finals, while the losing finalist advanced to the All-Ireland SFC qualifiers.

Ulster Senior Football Championship

The winning finalist advanced to the All-Ireland SFC quarter-finals, while the losing finalist advanced to the All-Ireland SFC qualifiers.

All-Ireland Series

Qualifiers

Round 1

Round 2
The four beaten provincial finalists played the four round 1 winners.

Latter stages

Bracket

Quarter-finals
The four provincial champions played the four winners of the qualifiers round 2.

Semi-finals
There was no semi-final draw as the pairings were arranged by rota.

Final

Hawk-Eye malfunction
The Hawk-Eye score detection system malfunctioned during the first half of the first All-Ireland SFC semi-final on 9 July between Derry and Galway, overruling an umpire who signalled that Shane Walsh's '45 into Hill 16 late in the half had gone over the bar. This meant that Galway entered the half-time break a point behind.

On Sky Sports at half-time, Jim McGuinness said: "It's a huge decision in the context of the game, and levelling the game up and Galway where they were, and to be back level at half time. I think the scoreboard should be level at half time, the reason I think that is because the technology got it wrong. The referee chalked it down as a point, the technology stepped in — it's not the other way around. the referee is well within his rights to say 'I got that right first time around, that's proven that it's right' and then to change the scoreboard. Otherwise, this game is going down to the wire, it feels that way and if it does go down to the wire, and that's what decides it, then we're in for major drama in the next couple of weeks". Over on RTÉ, Pat Spillane said: "It's an absolute joke. With our own two eyes, all of us here, that it went between the posts. It was most definitely a point. Hawk-Eye is available in a few grounds in Ireland, and they are getting huge money to get things right. A human error or not, that is scandalous. That is wrong". Lee Keegan added: "I can't even understand why they are calling Hawk-Eye. I don't see point in having it there if we can't get it right. As Pat rightly said, if that isn't rectified it is going to spoil the game."

A Conor Glass effort into the Davin End that Hawk-Eye ruled wide during the first half also came under scrutiny. "Conor Glass in the first-half... it looks like a point", Peter Canavan said on Sky Sports when the game had finished. Cora Staunton said on The Sunday Game the next evening: "When you look at that and get the behind the goals vision, that looks like it's a clear point, so yeah what happened yesterday with Hawk-Eye, it's not acceptable at that level. In an All-Ireland semi-final, you're training all year and something like that happens", while Oisín McConville said: "Even the Tailteann Cup game before it, it went to Hawk-Eye I think three times and you know, you question everything now. I mean all of the teams that have been beaten by a point, you question you know all along. Marty Clarke has also said that he thought had been a problem with Hawk-Eye and I think we all had accepted that that ball that's just marginally on the post, that that's over the bar. So it's not a correct science..."

The GAA issued a statement that evening confirming that Hawk-Eye would not be used during the second semi-final between Dublin and Kerry.

Galway GAA chairman Paul Bellew later stated that the team would not have returned to complete the second half of the game if Walsh's 45' had not been retrospectively awarded by the referee.

The GAA confirmed on 15 July that Hawk-Eye would return for the All-Ireland SHC final, following comprehensive testing and a full review of the score detection technology.

Glass, who expressed confusion after seeing Walsh's effort go over the bar only for it to be ruled out by Hawk-Eye, later said in an RTÉ Radio 1 interview: "I actually didn't realise (that the previous point was added on) until they went a point up after Shane Walsh's free kick five minutes into the second half... It wasn't communicated very well, either to the Derry staff or even the referee or GAA officials, that the point was added back on. The players didn't have a clue that it was."

Stadia and locations

Referees panel
Anthony Nolan was unavailable for the 2022 championship due to injury. Ciaran Branagan retired as he had turned 50 in 2021. Noel Mooney and Niall Cullen returned in their place. Maurice Deegan turned 50 in 2022 and retired at the end of this season.

Championship statistics

Top scorer: overall

Top scorer: single game

Scoring events
All records exclude extra time.
Widest winning margin: 23 points
Dublin 1–24 – 0-04 Wexford (Leinster Quarter-final)
Galway 4–20 – 0-09 Leitrim (Connacht Semi-final)
Kerry 1–28 – 0-08 Limerick (Munster Final)
Most goals in a match: 9
Wicklow 5–15 – 4–12 Laois (Leinster Preliminary round)
Most points in a match: 41
Dublin 1–27 – 1–14 Meath (Leinster Semi-final)
Most goals by one team in a match: 5
Louth 5–10 – 0–10 Carlow (Leinster Preliminary round)
Wicklow 5–15 – 4–12 Laois (Leinster Preliminary round)
Dublin 5–17 – 1–15 Kildare (Leinster Final)
Derry 5–13 – 2-08 Clare (All-Ireland Quarter-final)
Most points by one team in a match: 28
Kerry 1–28 – 0-08 Limerick (Munster Final)
Highest aggregate score: 54 points
Wicklow 5–15 – 4–12 Laois (Leinster Preliminary round)
Lowest aggregate score: 23 points
Derry 1-06 – 2-08 Galway (All-Ireland Semi-final)

Miscellaneous
 London and New York were both back in the Connacht championship after a 2-year break due to Covid-19. 
 Dublin's longest period as Leinster champions continues with a historic 12 in a row.
The All-Ireland title holders, Tyrone, were eliminated in the qualifiers; this is only the second time this has happened — the last time the holders were knocked out in the qualifiers was Tyrone in 2006.
Derry win the Ulster Senior Football Championship for the first time since 1998, and reached the All-Ireland semi-finals for the first time since 2004.
Galway reached the All-Ireland final for the first time since 2001.
Jack O'Connor of Meath scored the fastest ever championship goal against Wicklow, scoring 7 seconds into their Leinster Quarter-final meeting.
Clare retain their 100% win rate against Roscommon by beating the connacht side in the qualifiers.
First-time championship meetings:
 Mayo v Monaghan (Qualifiers Round 1)
 Clare vs Derry (Quarter-finals)

Awards

The Sunday Game Team of the Year
The Sunday Game team of the year was picked on 24 July, the night of the final. David Clifford was chosen as the Footballer of the Year by the RTÉ panel.

The Sunday Game Team of the Year 
1. Shane Ryan (Kerry)
2. Liam Silke (Galway)
3. Jason Foley (Kerry) 
4. Chrissy McKaigue (Derry)
5. James McCarthy (Dublin)
6. Tadhg Morley (Kerry)
7. Gavin White (Kerry) 
8. Rian O'Neill (Armagh)
9. Cillian McDaid (Galway)
10. Paudie Clifford (Kerry)
11. Seán O'Shea (Kerry)
12. Ciarán Kilkenny (Dublin)
13. David Clifford (Kerry)
14. Damien Comer (Galway)
15. Shane Walsh (Galway)

All Star Team of the Year
The All Star Team of the Year was picked on 28 October.
David Clifford was named as the All Stars Footballer of the Year with Galway's Jack Glynn picked as the All Stars Young Footballer of the Year.

 Player has previously been selected.

County breakdown
 Kerry = 7
 Galway = 5
 Derry = 2
 Dublin = 1

References

External links
GAA official website
GAA 2021 Master Fixture

 
All-Ireland Championship